K&W Cafeterias Inc. is a Southeastern United States chain of cafeteria-style restaurants. Its headquarters were located in Winston-Salem, North Carolina until the company's sale to Piccadilly Restaurants in 2022. K&W serves traditional Southern favorites including fried chicken, turnip greens, fried okra, and homemade desserts.

History
Grady T. Allred, Sr., a founder of K&W Cafeterias, entered the restaurant business on Thanksgiving Day 1935  as an employee of a small restaurant on Cherry Street in Winston-Salem, North Carolina. The Carolinian Coffee Shop was owned by brothers Thomas, Kenneth and William Wilson and their brother-in-law T.K. Knight. In 1937, the initials K&W (for Knight and Wilson) were adopted and K&W Restaurant was established.

Allred later acquired a one-third interest in the K&W Restaurant. After operating the restaurant with his partners for a few years, Allred purchased their interests and became the sole owner of K&W Restaurant around the year 1941.

The K&W Restaurant continued to flourish at the Winston-Salem Cherry Street location until fire damage forced it to close for several months. After repairs and restoration were completed, it reopened as a restaurant/cafeteria combination. The cafeteria concept of the operation became so popular and successful that Allred decided to convert the unit entirely to cafeteria style food service.

K&W occupied its original location in Winston-Salem until an urban renewal project forced a move to 720 Coliseum Drive in Winston-Salem.

Grady Allred, Sr. died in 1983. The chain continued to be operated by the third generation of his family.

On January 18, 1988, the K&W located at 380 Knollwood Street in Winston-Salem exploded due to a natural gas leak.  The restaurant was destroyed and the attached Sheraton hotel was severely damaged.  The blast occurred while the restaurant was closed.  Of the four persons in the lobby/cafeteria building at the time of the explosion, three sustained minor injuries.  A fourth person sustained a fractured ankle.  Both the restaurant and the hotel were damaged beyond repair and were subsequently demolished.  A lengthy 10-month investigation placed the blame indefinitely on Piedmont Natural Gas Company with questions raised about the installation of the gas line and the response protocol to the incident.  Investigators concluded the explosion would not have occurred if the gas company had inspected and maintained the high pressure pipeline as required by federal regulations. The pipeline, which was not coated to protect it from the elements, was so corroded that it sprang at least two small leaks before rupturing, according to investigators.

In 1991, K&W began offering takeout service through the To Go Shop. In 2009, K&W Catering began, for events such as weddings and corporate meetings.

While other cafeteria chains went bankrupt during the 1980s and 1990s, K&W continued to prosper.  From the original restaurant establishment, which seated 110 people, K&W now operates 11 cafeterias and has over 2500 employees throughout North Carolina, and Virginia.

On September 6, 2020, K&W announced it had filed for Chapter 11 bankruptcy protection due to the COVID-19 pandemic's effect on restaurants. The company emerged from bankruptcy in September 2021 after reducing the number of locations from 18 to 14 and the number of employees from 1,035 to 834.

On August 16, 2022, president Dax Allred announced the sale of K&W and its 11 locations to Piccadilly Restaurants.

References

External links

 K&W Cafeteria
 Kinsman, Kat. "Mehepyewpleez? A love letter to K&W Cafeteria." CNN. January 31, 2012.

Companies based in Winston-Salem, North Carolina
Economy of the Southeastern United States
Regional restaurant chains in the United States
Cafeteria-style restaurants
Companies that filed for Chapter 11 bankruptcy in 2020
Restaurants established in 1935
1935 establishments in North Carolina